The Ohio High School Athletic Association (OHSAA) is the governing body of athletic programs for junior and senior high schools in the state of Ohio.  The OHSAA governs eligibility of student athletes, resolves disputes, organizes levels of competition by divisional separation of schools according to attendance population, and conducts state championship competitions in all the OHSAA-sanctioned sports.

Membership
There are approximately 820 member high schools and 850 more schools in the 7th-8th grade division of the OHSAA.  Most public and private high schools in Ohio belong to the OHSAA.

Structure

Districts
The Association is divided into six districts, each with its own District Athletic Board, including the Central District, East District, Northeast District, Northwest District, Southeast District, and Southwest District.

The District boards conduct Sectional and District tournaments.  The main OHSAA board conducts Regional and State tournaments.

Classifications and divisions
Member high schools are divided into three classifications (A, AA, AAA).  Prior to 1989 many sports held tournaments based on these classifications.  Since then, each sport individually divides into numbered divisions based on enrollment, taking into account the total number of schools offering that varsity sport and placing an equal number of schools in each division.

The classifications (A being the smallest schools, AAA the largest) are still used to fill spots on the six District Athletic Boards (two representatives from each class).

The number of divisions varies based on how many schools offer that sport.  Football has the most, with seven divisions (Division I being the largest schools).  Three sports have a single division: Boys' Ice Hockey, Girls' Field Hockey, and Gymnastics.

History

The OHSAA is an unincorporated, non-profit organization founded in 1907. Members of the Western Ohio Superintendents' Round Table had frequently discussed the need of a central organization for high school athletics.  In 1906 they passed a resolution to appoint a committee, headed by George R. Eastman, the first President of the Board of Control.

The first OHSAA-sponsored state tournament, Track and Field, was held on May 23, 1908, at Denison University. Columbus North became the first state champions, finishing ahead of Dayton Steele.

The OHSAA is currently headed by a commissioner. Prior to 1925, the Board of Control officers handled duties now associated with the Commissioner.

In 1979, OHSAA adopted a bylaw prohibiting out-of-state students from competing in OHSAA-sponsored activities. This rule was affirmed by the Sixth Circuit Court of Appeals in the 1985 case Alerding v. Ohio High School Athletic Association, regarding St. Xavier High School students from Northern Kentucky.

Commissioners since 1925
 H.R. Townsend (1925–1944)
 Harold Emswiler (1944–1958)
 W.J. McConnell (1958–1963)
 Paul E. Landis (1963–1969)
 Harold A. Meyer (1969–1977)
 George D. Bates (1977–1980)
 Richard L. Armstrong (1980–1989)
 Clair Muscaro (1990–2004)
 Daniel B. Ross, Ph.D. (2004–2018)
 Jerry Snodgrass (2018-2020)
 Doug Ute (2020-present)

OHSAA–sponsored sports tournaments

Boys

Girls

 **(Individual/Doubles only, no Team championships)

Past team state champions

Schools with most team titles

 * X = single-gender school

Schools with most team titles in one sport

Schools with most consecutive team titles in one sport

 active streak

See also
 List of high schools in Ohio
 Ohio high school athletic conferences
 Mr. Football Award (Ohio)
 Ohio Christian School Athletic Association
 List of Ohio High School Athletic Association championships

References

External links
 Ohio High School Athletic Association official website
 Ohio Tennis Coaches' Association website
 Miami Valley Tennis Coaches' Association website

1907 establishments in Ohio
High school sports associations in the United States
High school sports in Ohio
1907 in American sports
Sports organizations established in 1907